Searcy is the largest city and county seat of White County, Arkansas, United States. According to 2019 Census Bureau estimates, the population of the city is 23,767.  It is the principal city of the Searcy, AR Micropolitan Statistical Area which encompasses all of White County.  The city takes its name from Richard Searcy, a judge for the Superior Court of the Arkansas Territory.  A college town, Searcy is the home of Harding University and ASU-Searcy.

History 
Originally named White Sulphur Springs, the town's name was changed in 1837, two years after White County was created. The state changed the county seat name to honor Richard Searcy (1794-1832), a prominent Arkansas Legislator.

The town contained a health spa from its conception until 1820, when the alum, chalybeate, and white sulphur springs for which the spa was known dried up.

Israel Moore, who had traveled west from Philadelphia, was in charge of laying out Searcy's original streets, and "he proceeded to name the major streets of Searcy for those of downtown Old Philadelphia near Independence Hall; Race, Arch, Market, Vine, Spring, and the tree-honoring streets of Cherry, Spruce, Locust and Pine."  In 1957, Searcy named Moore Street after the 19th-century founder.

Spring Street also has a namesake in Old City Philadelphia, but along with downtown Searcy's Spring Park, this refers to the early history of the Searcy area, when the community was known as White Sulphur Springs. As early as 1834, local springs with purported therapeutic properties initially drew visitors to the area, similar to the popular attraction to Hot Springs.

During the American Civil War, the Battle of Whitney's Lane was fought near Searcy, although the exact site is disputed. Searcy Landing, on the Little Red River, is the final resting place for some Union Army soldiers.

Searcy was incorporated on August 6, 1851,

The Smyrna Methodist Church located just to the west of Searcy is the oldest known church building still standing in the state. It was built in 1856 according to research done by David Stahle of the University of Arkansas Tree Ring Laboratory.

Searcy is also home to the oldest operational courthouse in the state, the White County Courthouse. Originally the home of the first permanent resident, David Crise, the courthouse was completed in 1837. After being replaced two times, the last rendition was built in 1871. The most recent courthouse has a clocktower with a model of the Liberty Bell dating from 1855.

Searcy was a stop on the defunct Missouri and North Arkansas Railroad, which provided passenger and freight service from 1906 to 1946 from Joplin, Missouri, to Helena in Phillips County in eastern Arkansas.

On August 9, 1965, a fire killed 53 civilian workers in a Titan II missile silo north of Searcy. It was one of the largest industrial accidents in American history.

Despite having lost many factory jobs in the late 20th century, Searcy experienced a brief economic revitalization in the past decade from the leasing of mineral rights to natural gas companies. Almost all drilling in the Fayetteville Shale area has since ceased. Some residents express concern about the deleterious environmental effect of the extensive drilling projects that have taken place.

In 2019, the city of Searcy was the winner of the "Small Business Revolution on Main Street" award of $500,000 to revamp six small businesses and a season featuring these renovations on the Hulu show hosted by Amanda Brinkman.

Geography

Climate
The climate in this area is characterized by hot, humid summers and generally mild to cool winters.  According to the Köppen Climate Classification system, Searcy has a humid subtropical climate, abbreviated "Cfa" on climate maps.

Demographics

2020 census

As of the 2020 United States census, there were 22,937 people, 8,205 households, and 4,810 families residing in the city.

2014
As of the census of 2014, there were 23,768 people, 8,140 households, and 4,495 families residing in the city. The racial makeup of the city was 86.8% White, 7.5% Black or African American, 0.5% Native American, 1.3% Asian, 0.1% Pacific Islander, 1.09% from other races, and 1.9% from two or more races.  4.6% of the population were Hispanic or Latino of any race.

There were 8,140 households, out of which 27.4% had children under the age of 18 living with them, 51.8% were married couples living together, 10.8% had a female householder with no husband present, and 34.1% were non-families. 29.5% of all households were made up of individuals, and 14.7% had someone living alone who was 65 years of age or older.  The average household size was 2.28 and the average family size was 2.86.

In the city, the population was spread out, with 20.5% under the age of 18, 23.4% from 18 to 24, 23.3% from 25 to 44, 17.8% from 45 to 64, and 14.7% who were 65 years of age or older.  The median age was 30 years. For every 100 females, there were 97.5 males.  For every 100 females age 18 and over, there were 97.5 males.

The median income for a household in the city was $33,415, and the median income for a family was $41,334. Males had a median income of $32,445 versus $21,142 for females. The per capita income for the city was $19,427.  About 11.7% of families and 15.0% of the population were below the U.S. poverty threshold, including 18.1% of those under age 18 and 8.0% of those age 65 or over.

Economy
One of the state's largest banks, First Security Bank, was established in downtown Searcy in 1932 as Security Bank.

In July 1978, Walmart opened its first distribution center (outside of Bentonville) in eastern Searcy. The facility is still open as a Sam's Club distribution center, while an additional larger facility has since opened in southern Searcy to service Walmart stores. The company has also operated a retail location in eastern Searcy (near the city's original distribution center) since the 1970s, originating as an earlier "Discount City" format that grew into a more common "supercenter" format over the course of two relocations farther eastward; a Neighborhood Market grocery location was added in more recent years in western Searcy.

In recent years, ITT, Maytag, and Kohler closed large factories in the city. Many companies associated with natural gas that supported the brief natural gas boom have also left the city and the economy has suffered. According to the online real estate database Zillow, housing prices have lost approximately 8% of value since 2012.

Latina Imports and Latina Nursery are also located in Searcy and is one of the largest female, Hispanic-owned companies in Arkansas.

Sales tax for purchases in Searcy is higher than the state average, at 9.5%.

Education

Public schools
Searcy is served by two public school districts. Searcy Public Schools — including Searcy High School, three elementary schools and middle and junior high campuses — serve all but the far eastern portion of the city.  That portion of the city is within the Riverview School District, which operates Riverview High School. The Riverview district is the result of a consolidation, effective July 1, 1991, of the Judsonia, Kensett, and Griffithville school districts. Previously, the Riverview portion of Searcy was part of the Kensett school district; Riverview High School was built in eastern Searcy following the consolidation.

Searcy Public Schools campuses include:
 Searcy High School
 Ahlf Junior High School
 Southwest Middle School
 McRae Elementary
 Sidney Deener Elementary
 Westside Elementary

Riverview High School and Riverview Junior High School are in Searcy, while the Riverview School District is served by two elementary schools outside of the city limits.

Private schools
 Harding Academy is a K-12 college preparatory school enrolling more than 600 students. Harding University oversees the school, which resides adjacent to the university campus.
 Liberty Christian School (PK – 6)
 CrossPointe Preparatory, a school affiliated with the National Association of University-Model Schools, opened in 2009.
 Sunshine School

Colleges and universities
 Harding University, a private, Christian university affiliated with the Churches of Christ founded in 1924, has its main campus in Searcy. Harding moved to Searcy in 1934 from Morrilton. With more than 6,100 students, Harding University is the largest private university in Arkansas.
 A campus of Arkansas State University is located in Searcy.  Formerly operating as Foothills Technical Institute, it is a technical campus of nearby Arkansas State University Beebe, and offers several two-year programs.  In order to create drilling jobs for local populace, the Searcy campus has partnered in training with the natural gas industry that is developing local natural resources.

Notable people
 Mike Beebe, former Governor of Arkansas
 Ed Bethune, former U. S. representative, 1979-1985
 George W. Bond, educator
 Stephen Mark Brown, opera singer
 John Paul Capps, politician
 Weston Dacus, NFL linebacker 
 Bryce Mitchell, Mixed Martial Artist in the UFC
 Les Eaves, state representative for White County since 2015
 James Hannah, Chief Justice of Arkansas Supreme Court
 Eugene Lambert, basketball and football coach

References

Further reading
 Muncy, Raymond Lee.  Searcy, Arkansas: A Frontier Town Grows up with America.  Harding Press:  Searcy, 1976.

External links

 
Searcy Chamber of Commerce official website
 Searcy information page from The Encyclopedia of Arkansas History & Culture
 Encyclopedia of Arkansas History & Culture entry: Searcy (White County)

 
Cities in White County, Arkansas
Cities in Little Rock–North Little Rock–Conway metropolitan area
County seats in Arkansas
Micropolitan areas of Arkansas
1838 establishments in Arkansas
Populated places established in 1838
Cities in Arkansas